Ergotamine/chlorcyclizine/caffeine, sold under the brand name Anervan, is an antimigraine medication, intended to be taken at the very beginning of a migraine episode.

References

Antimigraine drugs
Combination drugs